Bebearia mardania, the dark palm forester, is a butterfly in the family Nymphalidae. It is found in Guinea, Sierra Leone, Liberia, Ivory Coast, Ghana, Togo, Nigeria, western Cameroon and the Republic of the Congo. The habitat consists of forests.

The larvae feed on Phoenix reclinata, Hyphaene thebaica the Borassus palm and the coconut palm.

References

Butterflies described in 1793
mardania
Taxa named by Johan Christian Fabricius